Erygia precedens is a moth of the family Erebidae. It is found from the Indo-Australian tropics to Australia, Fiji and Samoa.

Adults are similar to Erygia antecedens, but the forewings have a paler ground colour and are slightly deeper and more produced apically in antecedens.

The larvae have been recorded feeding on Calliandra species.

References

Moths described in 1852
Erygia
Moths of Asia
Moths of Oceania